Sunderland Association Football Club was founded in September 1880 as Sunderland and District Teachers Association Football Club. After turning professional in 1886, the club appointed Tom Watson as their first manager, and under Watson the team won the Football League First Division three times in four seasons. The percentage of games won under Watson remains the highest of all time for a Sunderland manager. Watson left to manage Liverpool and was replaced by Robert Campbell, but the new manager failed to continue the success of his predecessor. The next three managers, Alex Mackie, Bob Kyle and Johnny Cochrane, each won the First Division title while at the club. Kyle's 817 games in charge, spread over 19 full seasons either side of the First World War, make him Sunderland's longest-serving manager. Cochrane led the club to their first FA Cup victory, beating Preston North End 3–1 in the 1937 final. The closest they had come in previous seasons was as losing finalists in 1913 under Kyle.

After Cochrane, no manager won a trophy until Bob Stokoe led the team to their second FA Cup with a 1–0 win over Leeds United in the 1973 FA Cup Final. Stokoe took Sunderland into European competition for the first time in their history, but they were knocked out in the second round of the UEFA Cup Winners' Cup by Sporting Clube de Portugal. Len Ashurst led Sunderland to their first League Cup final, which they lost 1–0 to Norwich City, but relegation brought him the sack at the end of the season. Under Lawrie McMenemy, Sunderland were relegated to the Third Division for the first time in their history. Following this, Denis Smith was named as manager, and saw the club back into the Second Division.

Peter Reid brought Sunderland to the Premier League for the first time in their history in the 1996–97 season, but they were relegated in their debut season. The team progressed as far as the Division One play-off final in 1998, drawing 4–4 after extra time before losing 7–6 on penalties, and went one step further the following season, winning promotion as champions with a record total, at that time, of 105 points. Still led by Reid, they went on to achieve their highest place finish in the Premier League, finishing seventh in two consecutive seasons, and narrowly missed out on a UEFA Cup place. In 2002–03, Sunderland had three different managers, with Reid, Howard Wilkinson and, towards the end of the season, Mick McCarthy; the club ended that season with a then record low total of 19 points. Under McCarthy, a third-place finish in the Championship earned Sunderland a place in the 2003–04 play-offs, only to lose to Crystal Palace in the semi-finals; in 2004–05, they were promoted as champions, clinching the title with a 2–1 win over West Ham. In March 2006, McCarthy was sacked in a season where Sunderland gained just 15 points, breaking their previous record, with former player Kevin Ball taking over as caretaker manager for the remaining games. Following a takeover of the club, incoming chairman Niall Quinn acted as manager until Roy Keane's appointment three weeks into the 2006–07 season. Keane went on to win the Championship title in his first season of management. After keeping the side in the Premier League, he resigned in December 2008 and Ricky Sbragia eventually assumed the role after a spell as caretaker. Sbragia resigned immediately after the final match of the 2008–09 season, when Sunderland had achieved survival in the Premier League. Wigan Athletic manager Steve Bruce was appointed as his successor in June 2009. Having spent two-and-a-half years as manager, Bruce was sacked on 30 November 2011. Martin O'Neill, a boyhood fan of the club, was appointed as manager on 3 December 2011. Sunderland's form soon took off, picking up 27 points in O'Neill's first 18 league games in charge, as well as reaching an FA Cup quarter-final. However, the team underperformed during the 2012–13 season, and on 30 March 2013, O'Neill was sacked. The following day on 31 March 2013, Paolo Di Canio was appointed on a -year contract. Di Canio was sacked less than six months later with Sunderland bottom of the Premier League.

Key

Key to record:
M = Matches played
W = Matches won
D = Matches drawn
L = Matches lost
% = Win ratio

Managers
As of 30 January 2022. Only professional, competitive matches are counted, including; League, FA Cup, League Cup and other cup competitions. Dates for earlier years are only months because of unclear statistics.

References

External links

Manager details at The Stat Cat: Sunderland A.F.C. playing history
Manager details at Soccerbase

Managers
 
Sunderland A.F.C.